Fredy Reyna (April 3, 1917 - March 26, 2001) was a Venezuelan musician, arranger and performer, regarded as the one of the two masters of the Venezuelan cuatro, which he elevated to the level of a concert instrument, and one of his country's most important cultural figures in the 20th century.

Discography
1. As a Cuatro Soloist
 Método de Cuatro - 200 fórmulas de acompañamiento  - Caracas: Ediciones Fredy Reyna, 1956
 Cuatro Suites de “Cuatro” - Caracas: Ediciones Fredy Reyna, 1957,1958
 América en el Cuatro - Caracas: Ediciones Fredy Reyna, 1958
 Fredy Reyna - Solos de Cuatro - Caracas: Ediciones Fredy Reyna, 1972
 Fredy Reyna - Solos de Cuatro - Caracas: Ediciones Fredy Reyna, 1981
 Danzas y Canciones para los Niños - Caracas: Fundación Fredy Reyna, 1981
 Homenaje al Libertador Simón Bolívar - Solos de cuatro - Caracas: Ediciones Fredy Reyna, 1983
 El cuatro de Fredy Reyna - Caracas: Fundación Fredy Reyna, FUNDEF, 1994
 Homenaje a Fredy Reyna - Caracas: D'Empaire Reyna & Asociados, 1997
 Fredy Reyna, cuatro solista - Caracas: Deltaven-PDV, 1997

2. As a publisher
 Song
 Carlos Enrique Reyna Serenata - Caracas: Ediciones Fredy Reyna, 1958
 Morella Muñoz Canciones de América - Caracas: Ediciones Fredy Reyna, 1958
 Conny Méndez A mi Caracas - Caracas: Ediciones Fredy Reyna, 1967
 Paco Vera Cantos y Corridos - Caracas: Fundación Fredy Reyna, 1992
Poetry
 Aquiles Nazoa Poesía y humor de Aquiles Nazoa - Caracas: Ediciones Fredy Reyna, 1958
 Miguel Otero Silva Elegía coral  Andrés Eloy Blanco - Caracas: Ediciones Fredy Reyna, 1958
Piano music
Rosita Montes and Luisa Amelia Azerm (accompanied on the cuatro by Raul Borges, Ramón E. Azerm and Fredy Reyna) Piano a cuatro manos. Música instrumental del siglo pasado - Caracas: Ediciones Fredy Reyna, 1956
Luisa Elena Paesano - Valses de Luisa Elena Paesano - Caracas: Ediciones Fredy Reyna, 1969

3. As artistic director
 El Ultimo Cañón - Caracas: Sociedad de Amigos de la Música, 1956
 Tun tun In addition to artistic direction, Reyna played cuatro, scraper, furruco (Venezuelan friction drum), bells, pandeiro and sang background vocals. - Caracas Fundación Fredy Reyna, Dimagen, 1980.

4. As recording engineer/editor
 Alirio Díaz and Morella Muñoz Alirio y Morella: Canciones, tonadas y aguinaldos venezolanos - Caracas: Espiral, 1967
 Abraham Abreu Curso de Iniciación Musical - Caracas; Inciba 1968

5. As musical guest (solo cuatro)
 Selección de Música de Venezuela - Caracas Compañía Shell de Venezuela, 1957
 Serenata Guayanesa El canto popular venezolano - Aguinaldos - Caracas, 1976

See also 
Venezuela
Venezuelan music

1917 births
2001 deaths
People from Caracas
Venezuelan cuatro players
Venezuelan folk musicians
Venezuelan musicians